Zygophyllum fabago is a species of plant known by the common name Syrian bean-caper. It is considered a noxious weed of economic importance in much of the western United States. It is native to Asia and East Europe (Russia and Ukraine) and Southeast Europe (Romania).

Growth
The Syrian bean-caper grows long, thin stems with few oval-shaped, fleshy, waxy green leaflets each 2 to 3 centimeters in length. The flowers are small, compact bunches of five petals each with prominent stamens. The flowers have a taste and scent similar to caper. It grows in masses of individual plants, forming colonies, especially in dry, gravelly, saline, or disturbed areas where other plant life is rare.

Characteristics
The plant has invasive potential due to its long taproot which, even if fragmented, can produce a new plant, as well as the hardy wax coating on its leaves that tends to protect it from herbicides.

Chemical constituents
It contains about 0.002% harmine (entire plant).

References

External links
Jepson Manual Treatment
Photos
Info Sheet

fabago
Flora of Western Asia
Flora of Eastern Europe
Medicinal plants
Plants described in 1753
Taxa named by Carl Linnaeus